The 2006–07 season was the 81st season in the existence of S.S.C. Napoli and the club's first season back in the second division of Italian football. They participated in the Serie B and Coppa Italia.

Competitions

Overview

Serie B

League table

Results summary

Results by round

Matches

Source:

Coppa Italia

References

S.S.C. Napoli seasons
Napoli